The 1985 Indiana Hoosiers football team represented Indiana University Bloomington during the 1985 Big Ten Conference football season. Led by second-year head coach Bill Mallory, the Hoosiers compiled an overall record of 4–7 with a mark of 1–7 in conference play, tying for ninth place in the Big Ten. The team played home games at Memorial Stadium in Bloomington, Indiana.

Schedule

Personnel

Season summary

Purdue

1986 NFL draftees

References

Indiana
Indiana Hoosiers football seasons
Indiana Hoosiers football